Robert Muller (1 September 1925 – 27 May 1998) was a German-born British journalist and screenwriter, who mainly worked in television. Since his father was Jewish, he emigrated to Britain in 1938 as a thirteen-year-old refugee from Nazi Germany.

Selected works

Film
 Woman of Straw (1964)
 The Beauty Jungle (1964)
 I'm an Elephant, Madame (1969)
 The Roaring Fifties (1983)

Television
 London Playhouse: "Jane Clegg" (dir. Peter Cotes, 1956)
 Armchair Theatre: "The Night Conspirators" (Philip Saville, 1962)
 Armchair Theatre: "Afternoon of a Nymph" (1962)
 Armchair Theatre: "Thank You and Goodnight" (1962)
 Armchair Theatre: "The Paradise Suite" (1963)
 Playdate: "The Night Conspirators" (1963)
 Armchair Theatre: "Pleasure Is Where She Finds It" (Charles Jarrott, 1964)
 Story Parade: "The World That Summer" (Peter Sasdy, 1965)
 Armchair Mystery Theatre: "Man and Mirror" (Patrick Dromgoole, 1965)
 Armchair Theatre: "A Cold Peace" (Don Leaver, 1965)
 Mystery and Imagination: "The Body Snatcher" (Toby Robertson, 1966)
 The Wednesday Play: "The Executioner" (Michael Hayes, 1966)
 Die Unberatenen (Peter Zadek, 1966) — based on a novel by 
 Out of the Unknown: "The Prophet" (Naomi Capon, 1967) — based on "Reason" by Isaac Asimov
 Armchair Theatre: "Easier in the Dark" (Don Leaver, 1967)
 Armchair Theatre: "A World of Time" (Don Leaver, 1967)
 Theatre 625: "Henry IV" (Michael Hayes, 1967) — based on Luigi Pirandello's Henry IV
 Haunted: "After the Funeral" (Don Leaver, 1967)
 The Wednesday Play: "Death of a Private" (James Ferman, 1967) — loosely based on Woyzeck
 Man in a Suitcase: "The Bridge" (Pat Jackson, 1967)
 Armchair Theatre: "You and Me" (Kim Mills, 1968)
 Nana (John Davies, 1968, TV miniseries)
 Mystery and Imagination: "Frankenstein" (Voytek, 1968)
 Out of the Unknown: "Beach Head" (James Cellan Jones, 1969) — based on a story by Clifford D. Simak
 Out of the Unknown: "The Naked Sun" (Rudolph Cartier, 1969)
 Mystery and Imagination: "The Suicide Club" (Mike Vardy, 1970)
 Take Three Girls (1971, TV series, 4 episodes)
 Bel Ami (John Davies, 1971, TV miniseries) — based on Guy de Maupassant's Bel-Ami
 Die Sonne angreifen (Peter Lilienthal, 1971) — based on a novel by Witold Gombrowicz
 Public Eye: "Shades of White" (Piers Haggard, 1971)
 Man of Straw (Herbert Wise, 1972, TV miniseries) — based on Der Untertan by Heinrich Mann
 Van der Valk und das Mädchen (Peter Zadek, 1972) — based on a novel by Nicolas Freeling
 The Song of Songs (Peter Wood, 1973, TV miniseries)
  (Wolfgang Petersen, 1973) — based on a novel by Nicolas Freeling
 Colditz: "Chameleon" (Philip Dudley, 1974)
 Fall of Eagles: "Indian Summer of an Emperor" (Donald McWhinnie, 1974)
 Omnibus: "The Need for Nightmare" (Harley Cokeliss, 1974)
 Churchill's People: "The Lost Island" (Philip Saville, 1975) — based on A History of the English-Speaking Peoples
 A Legacy (Derek Martinus, 1975, TV miniseries)
 Private Affairs: "A Dream of Living" (Philip Saville, 1975)
 Van der Valk und die Toten (1975) — based on a novel by Nicolas Freeling
 Ten from the Twenties: "Motherlove" (Mark Cullingham, 1975) — based on a story by J. D. Beresford
 Ten from the Twenties: "Her Wedding Morn" (Barry Letts, 1975) — based on a story by Sheila Kaye-Smith
 Ten from the Twenties: "The Fifty Pound Note" (Mark Cullingham, 1975) — based on a story by A. E. Coppard
 Supernatural: "Ghosts of Venice" (Claude Whatham, 1977)
 Supernatural: "Countess Ilona" (Simon Langton, 1977)
 Supernatural: "The Werewolf Reunion" (Simon Langton, 1977)
 Supernatural: "Mr Nightingale" (Alan Cooke, 1977)
 Supernatural: "Lady Sybil" (Simon Langton, 1977)
 The Hunchback of Notre Dame (Alan Cooke, 1977) — based on The Hunchback of Notre-Dame
 Supernatural: "Night of the Marionettes" (Alan Cooke, 1977)
 Supernatural: "Dorabella" (Simon Langton, 1977)
 Prince Regent (Michael Simpson and Michael Hayes, 1979, TV miniseries)
 The World That Summer (1980)
 Exil (Egon Günther, 1981, TV miniseries) — based on a novel by Lion Feuchtwanger
 Blood and Honor: Youth Under Hitler (1982, TV miniseries)
 Russian Night... 1941 (Desmond Davis, 1982) — based on a story by Aleksandr Solzhenitsyn
  (Peter Weck, 1982) — based on Mrs. 'Arris Goes to Paris by Paul Gallico
 Nachruf auf Othello (1983) — based on a novel by 
 Storyboard: "Secrets" (Peter Sasdy, 1983)
  (1984) — based on a novel by 
 Die Fräulein von damals (Dietrich Haugk, 1986)
 Albert Schweitzer (1987, TV miniseries)
 Rothenbaumchaussee (Dietrich Haugk, 1991)

References

Bibliography
  Anthony Grenville. Refugees from the Third Reich in Britain. Rodopi, 2002.

External links

1925 births
1998 deaths
People from Hamburg
British screenwriters
British television writers
British male television writers
Emigrants from Nazi Germany to the United Kingdom
20th-century British screenwriters
British people of German-Jewish descent